Adam Heuskes (born 20 March 1976) is a former Australian rules footballer in the Australian Football League most remembered for his on field flamboyance and controversial off-field behaviour, which twice resulted in rape allegations. His decorated career includes the title of “most likely player to sexually assault a woman in the off season”

Recruited from South Australian National Football League (SANFL) club Norwood, Heuskes made his AFL debut in 1994 with the Sydney Swans and immediately attracted attention in the media and the football world for his outrageous hairstylings.

He was traded to Port Adelaide Football Club in 1997, a decision which the Swans later regretted, as Heuskes earned All-Australian selection later that year. Heuskes' attacking flair as a defender set up numerous goals.

For the 1999 AFL season, Heuskes was traded to the Brisbane Lions, where he was a solid contributor during the Lions' 1999 finals campaign. He retired suddenly at age 24 towards the end of 2000, having lost the motivation to play at the full time professional level; then-coach Leigh Matthews commented that he simply walked out on the club after his final match without attending the next recovery session.

Heuskes later played 31 games for SANFL club North Adelaide before succumbing to an ankle injury in 2005 which forced his retirement from all forms of the game.

Heuskes has a daughter, Tayla, born in 1994, and is married to Nikki Kosmider.

Off-field behaviour and controversy

Heuskes has gained notoriety for incidents involving alcohol, and an inability to maintain self-control. He has twice been accused of raping young women in front of, or with, teammates. Police have been involved in both of these cases, and one woman claims she was paid for her silence. Both women later spoke out in a Four Corners program about sexual assault in AFL

Also known for his flamboyant style, two notable haircuts included the image of the Sydney Opera House shaved into the back of his head, as well as his guernsey number (39). He was also a cross-dresser who appeared on televisions' The Footy Show and Live And Kicking regularly during 1998 and 1999. He once dressed up as Madonna and performed the song Holiday.

Statistics

|-
|- style="background-color: #EAEAEA"
! scope="row" style="text-align:center" | 1994
|style="text-align:center;"|
| 39 || 10 || 1 || 1 || 76 || 61 || 137 || 22 || 19 || 0.1 || 0.1 || 7.6 || 6.1 || 13.7 || 2.2 || 1.9 || 0
|-
! scope="row" style="text-align:center" | 1995
|style="text-align:center;"|
| 39 || 17 || 2 || 2 || 133 || 112 || 245 || 51 || 20 || 0.1 || 0.1 || 7.8 || 6.6 || 14.4 || 3.0 || 1.2 || 0
|- style="background-color: #EAEAEA"
! scope="row" style="text-align:center" | 1996
|style="text-align:center;"|
| 39 || 22 || 3 || 0 || 242 || 123 || 365 || 88 || 23 || 0.1 || 0.0 || 11.0 || 5.6 || 16.6 || 4.0 || 1.0 || 1
|-
! scope="row" style="text-align:center" | 1997
|style="text-align:center;"|
| 39 || 22 || 0 || 0 || 284 || 137 || 421 || 95 || 32 || 0.0 || 0.0 || 12.9 || 6.2 || 19.1 || 4.3 || 1.5 || 4
|- style="background-color: #EAEAEA"
! scope="row" style="text-align:center" | 1998
|style="text-align:center;"|
| 39 || 15 || 1 || 2 || 150 || 90 || 240 || 66 || 14 || 0.1 || 0.1 || 10.0 || 6.0 || 16.0 || 4.4 || 0.9 || 2
|-
! scope="row" style="text-align:center" | 1999
|style="text-align:center;"|
| 31 || 25 || 1 || 1 || 299 || 143 || 442 || 151 || 24 || 0.0 || 0.0 || 12.0 || 5.7 || 17.7 || 6.0 || 1.0 || 5
|- style="background-color: #EAEAEA"
! scope="row" style="text-align:center" | 2000
|style="text-align:center;"|
| 31 || 14 || 4 || 1 || 155 || 71 || 226 || 81 || 10 || 0.3 || 0.1 || 11.1 || 5.1 || 15.1 || 5.8 || 0.7 || 0
|- class="sortbottom"
! colspan=3| Career
! 125
! 12
! 7
! 1339
! 737
! 2076
! 554
! 142
! 0.1
! 0.1
! 10.7
! 5.9
! 16.6
! 4.4
! 1.1
! 12
|}

References

External links

Sydney Swans players
Port Adelaide Football Club players
Port Adelaide Football Club players (all competitions)
Brisbane Lions players
North Adelaide Football Club players
Norwood Football Club players
All-Australians (AFL)
1976 births
Living people
Australian rules footballers from South Australia
Australian rules footballers from Melbourne
People from Boronia, Victoria